French Branch is a  long 1st order tributary to the Trent River in Jones County, North Carolina.

Course
French Branch rises about 2 miles west of Olivers Crossroads, North Carolina and then flows north to join the Trent River about 2 miles southeast of Trenton.

Watershed
French Branch drains  of area, receives about 53.5 in/year of precipitation, has a wetness index of 596.29, and is about 14% forested.

See also
List of rivers of North Carolina

References

Rivers of North Carolina
Rivers of Jones County, North Carolina